Rheinmetall AG is a German automotive and arms manufacturer, headquartered in Düsseldorf, Germany. Its shares are traded on the Frankfurt stock exchange.

History
Banker and investor Lorenz Zuckermandel (1847–1928) was one of the founders and the first chairman of the supervisory board. The company manufactured steel products, including armaments.

During the post-World War I disarmament of Germany, Rheinmetall diversified, but by the 1930s armament manufacture resumed. In 1933, it acquired A. Borsig GmbH, which manufactured locomotives.

In 1999 it bought the Swiss firm Oerlikon Contraves, which it renamed Rheinmetall Air Defence in 2009.
 
At some point it bought the Swiss firm Oerlikon Contraves Pyrotec, which it later renamed RWM Schweiz.

In 2009 it bought RF Engines on the Isle of Wight.

References

External links

 
 

 
1889 establishments in Germany
Defence companies of Germany
Engineering companies of Germany
Companies in the MDAX